John George Stuart Donaldson, Baron Donaldson of Kingsbridge, OBE (9 October 1907  8 March 1998) was a British politician and public servant. He was a soldier, farmer, prison reformer, approved school manager, and consumers' champion .

Life
Jack Donaldson was the son of the Rev. S. A. Donaldson, sometime Master of Magdalene College, Cambridge, and Lady Albinia Donaldson (née Hobart-Hampden), the sister of the 7th Earl of Buckinghamshire. He was educated at Eton College (where he founded a jazz band called The Eton Outcasts) and at Trinity College, Cambridge, and married Frances Lonsdale in 1935. In 1939 he was commissioned into the Royal Engineers and served throughout the Second World War, reaching the rank of lieutenant-colonel and being appointed Officer of the Order of the British Empire (OBE) in 1943.

He was created a life peer as Baron Donaldson of Kingsbridge, of Kingsbridge in the County of Buckingham on 20 November 1967. He was Parliamentary Under-Secretary of State at the Northern Ireland Office from 1974 to 1976, and served as Minister for the Arts from 1976 until the end of James Callaghan's government three years later. He left the Labour Party for the Social Democratic Party (SDP) in 1981, and remained with the Liberal Democrats after the SDP merger with the Liberals.

From 1968 to 1971 he was Chairman of the National Consumer Council.

His grandson is Fred Deakin of Lemon Jelly.

Works 
 Farming in Britain Today (1969) with Frances Donaldson and Derek Barber
 Jack Donaldson: A Soldier's Letters (2017) A posthumous edition of letters written in the Second World War, 1939-45

Portraits of Jack Donaldson 
The United Kingdom's National Portrait Gallery holds the following portrait featuring Lord Donaldson of Kingsbridge as a sitter: Exhibit number P528: John George Stuart Donaldson, Baron Donaldson of Kingsbridge and Frances Annesley (née Lonsdale), Lady Donaldson of Kingsbridge by Derry Moore, 12th Earl of Drogheda.  Painted in 1992; medium: colour print; measurements: 14 7/8 in. x 12 in. (379 mm x 305 mm). See http://www.npg.org.uk/live/search/portrait.asp?search=ap&npgno=P528 for more information.

Arms

References 

1907 births
1998 deaths
Prison reformers
Labour Party (UK) life peers
Social Democratic Party (UK) life peers
Liberal Democrats (UK) life peers
People educated at Eton College
Alumni of Trinity College, Cambridge
Royal Engineers officers
British Army personnel of World War II
Officers of the Order of the British Empire
Northern Ireland Office junior ministers
Life peers created by Elizabeth II